Webjet Limited is a global digital travel business operating in both consumer (B2C) and wholesale (B2B) markets. Webjet Limited's Registered Office is located in Melbourne, Australia.

The consumer division includes Webjet, an online travel agency (OTA) in Australia and New Zealand, and Online Republic, a New Zealand-based online travel booking business.

The wholesale division, WebBeds is  a travel intermediary, providing accommodation and ground services to the travel industry through booking websites. The company trades globally operating three locally managed regional divisions — Asia Pacific (APAC), Americas Middle East & Africa (AMEA) and Europe.

Brands

B2C Division

Webjet 
Established in 1998, Webjet is an online travel agency in Australia and New Zealand.

GoSee 
Webjet acquired the online travel booking group Online Republic in May 2016 for $NZ85 million. In 2021, Online Republic rebranded as GoSee which is a global e-commerce group based in New Zealand.

B2B Division

WebBeds 
WebBeds is a travel provider brand established in February 2013. WebBeds currently operates trade-only booking platforms Lots of Hotels, Sunhotels, Fit Ruums, Totalstay and DOTW, and specialist travel brands JacTravel DMC and Umrah Holidays International.

Lots of Hotels  
The WebBeds business launched with the establishment of Lots of Hotels in Dubai during late 2013. In November 2015, Lots of Hotels North America was launched.

Sunhotels (Europe) 
Webjet acquired European online hotel provider Sunhotels in September 2014. In August 2016, it was announced Sunhotels (as a subsidiary of Webjet Limited) was set to assume control of over 3,000 hotel contracts owned by European tour operating group Thomas Cook. The transition of this partnership deal is expected to be complete by January 2019 .

FIT Ruums (Asia) 
Launched in November 2016, FIT Ruums focuses on B2B travel distribution for worldwide hotel accommodation and transfers in Asia. FIT Ruums has offices in Singapore, Hong Kong, South Korea, Indonesia, Taiwan, Malaysia, India, Thailand, China, and Japan.

JacTravel  
Acquired in September 2017, JacTravel is a global hotel accommodation supplier, specialising in inbound group travel services to the United Kingdom, Ireland and Europe. JacTravel is headquartered in London and has offices throughout the United Kingdom, Europe, Asia, the Middle East, and North America.

Totalstay 
Previously known as Exclusively Hotels, Totalstay.com was launched in Europe in 2006. Totalstay is a hotel booking tool for travel agents.

DOTW 
Webjet Limited acquired Destinations of the World in 2018. DOTW is a B2B travel booking platform specializing in the Middle East.

Umrah Holidays International 
WebBeds launched Umrah Holidays International in 2018, a specialist B2B brand providing online pilgrimage travel services to the travel industry .

History
Webjet was established by former Jetset Travel Chief Executive David Clarke, Allan Nahum and John Lemish in 1998.

The company was publicly listed on the ASX in 2000 through a reverse takeover deal with Roper River Resources NL.[8] Roper River Resources NL became Webjet NL on 18 April 2000 and was later changed to Webjet Limited on 15 June 2000. On 31 May 2001 Webjet became 100% automated, allowing customers to fully complete their bookings online. Webjet launched a WAP website in May 2002 for mobile phones and offered SMS customer support.

In April 2010, Webjet Limited commenced operations in North America through a joint venture with Mathias Friess, formerly General Manager of Global Sales and Distribution of Virgin Australia, and Head of Sales North America for Lufthansa. Webjet entered into a joint venture with Westminster Travel in Asia to initially cover the establishment of Webjet in Singapore and Hong Kong. This was followed by the launch of Webjet in Canada in December 2010.

In February 2011, John Guscic was appointed as Webjet's Managing Director, after serving on the Webjet board since 2003. In the same month, Webjet launched Lots of Hotels.

In April 2012, Webjet OTA signed as a major sponsor of the Melbourne Football Club, with players sporting the Webjet.com.au logo on the front of their club guernseys less than 24 hours after the deal was struck. In the same month, Webjet also partnered with Australian loyalty program flybuys.

In July 2012, Webjet entered into its first international franchise agreement with BidTravel in South Africa.

In March 2013, Webjet acquired Zuji in Australia, Hong Kong and Singapore from Travelocity for $25 million.

In November 2013, Webjet signed a two-year deal as the principal sponsor of Sydney Thunder for the 2012/2013 and 2013/2014 seasons.

In February 2014, Webjet and Sydney FC agreed to a new major commercial partnership which renewed their status as the principal partner of the team since the beginning of the 2012/2013 Hyundai A-League season. Webjet entered into a binding Heads of Agreement to acquire the SunHotels Group in Europe, and was fully acquired by September 2014.

In February 2015, Webjet began accepting Bitcoin on holiday package bookings, making it one of the first Australian retailers to accept the electronic currency in their payment process.

In May 2016, Webjet formally disclosed its acquisition of former rival Online Republic through the airing of a video in national TV, showing the Airport Rentals (Australia) brand .

On 9 November 2016, Webjet announced the sale of Zuji for $56 million, doubling its investment.

In June 2017, Webjet announced the conclusion of its joint venture with Mathias Friess, by selling its remaining interest in Webjet in North America. Webjet re-acquired the rights to Webjet.com, with the remaining brand and operations transitioning over to 'Flyus.com'.

In August 2017, Webjet announced the purchase of UK-based Jac Travel (who in turn had acquired its rival Totalstay in 2015).

In March 2021, Webjet announced an investment in LockTrip.

References

Australian brands
Australian travel websites
Australian companies established in 1998
Transport companies established in 1998
Internet properties established in 1998
Travel and holiday companies of Australia
Online travel agencies
Travel ticket search engines
Companies based in Melbourne
Companies listed on the Australian Securities Exchange